

2021

This is a list of Ecuadorian regions by Human Development Index as of 2023, using the 2021 data.

2018 

This is a list of Ecuadorian provinces by Human Development Index as of 2019, using the 2018 data. The following report is not official, but it is calculated with the official data of the indicators of the index, given by the National Institute of Statistics and Censuses (INEC), and the Central Bank of Ecuador (BCE).

See also
List of countries by Human Development Index

References 

Provinces
Ecuador
Ecuador